Ramo Matala Makani (born 22 September 1960) is a Tanzanian CCM politician and Member of Parliament for Tunduru North constituency since 2010.

References

1960 births
Living people
Chama Cha Mapinduzi MPs
Tanzanian MPs 2010–2015
Lindi Secondary School alumni
Tosamaganga Secondary School alumni
University of Dar es Salaam alumni